Abdullah Dıjlan Aydın (born 16 June 2000) is a Turkish professional footballer who plays as a midfielder for Karacabey Belediyespor on loan from Süper Lig club İstanbulspor.

Career
Aydın is a youth product of Galatasaray, Beylerbeyi, and İstanbulspor. He signed his first professional contract with İstanbulspor in 2019 where he was assigned to their reserves. He joined Karacabey Belediyespor on 2 consecutive loans from 2020 to 2022 in the TFF Second League. Returning to İstanbulspor for the 2022-23 season as they were newly promoted to the Süper Lig, he made his debut with them in a 1–0 league win over Alanyaspor on 27 August 2022.

On 20 January 2023, Aydın returned to Karacabey Belediyespor for his third loan.

References

External links
 
 

2000 births
Living people
People from Diyarbakır Province
Turkish footballers
Association football midfielders
Süper Lig players
TFF First League players
TFF Second League players
İstanbulspor footballers
Karacabey Belediyespor footballers